Events from the year 1907 in Sweden

Incumbents
 Monarch – Oscar II (until December 8), Gustaf V (starting December 8)
 Prime Minister – Arvid Lindman

Events

 23 January - Sweden's record highest atmospheric pressure value occurs in Kalmar and Visby at 1063.7 hPa.
 11 March - SKF is founded.
 8 December – King Oscar II dies and is succeeded by his eldest son, Gustaf V.
 Swedish Emigration Commission

Births

 14 March – Björn-Erik Höijer, writer
 15 March – Zarah Leander, actress
 11 April - Nancy Eriksson, social democrat

Deaths

 21 February – Erik Gustaf Boström, prime minister 
 8 December – Oscar II of Sweden, monarch 
 28 December – Louise Granberg, playwright and theater director
 - Hedvig Raa-Winterhjelm, actress and drama teacher  (born 1838)

References

 
Years of the 20th century in Sweden
Sweden